The evolution of motorways construction in European countries by total number of kilometers existing in that year.
This is a list of the total number of Motorways by country in Europe. It includes motorways (controlled-access highways), classified as such by the Eurostat and includes countries that are not members of the European Union but geographically are situated in Europe.

Countries by motorways built before 1952

Countries by motorways built between 1955 and 1970

Countries by motorways built between 1971 and 1985

Countries by motorways built between 1986 and 2000

Countries by motorways built between 2001 and 2015 

* Note: Due to the new European standards in 2011 some European countries had their total number of motorways diminished. Examples being Iceland form 11 to 0, or Estonia 115 to 0, they became either expressways or national highways.
** Note: This table includes countries that are geographically situated in Asia but are integrated into the European Road System (example E80 in Turkey): Armenia, Azerbaijan, Georgia and Turkey.

Countries by motorways built between 2016 and 2025

See also
 Evolution of motorway construction in European Union member states
 Highway systems by country
 List of controlled-access highway systems
 Transport in Europe

References

External links
 https://ec.europa.eu/eurostat/tgm/refreshTableAction.do?tab=table&plugin=1&pcode=ttr00002&language=en The total length of motorways according to Eurostat
 https://web.archive.org/web/20180301201930/https://www.cia.gov/library/publications/resources/the-world-factbook/fields/2085.html CIA, The world factbook
 http://www.gddkia.gov.pl/pl/1037/sprawdz-na-mapie-przygotowanie-drog-i-autostrad Map of motorways and expressways in Poland built, under construction, planned
 https://stats.oecd.org/glossary/ "Glossary of Statistical Terms". Retrieved 2020-05-01.
 http://www.realitatea.md/clasamentul-european-al-autostrazilor-ara-cu-cei-mai-mul-i-kilometri-de-autostrada_9998.html
 http://www.manager.ro/articole/analize/analizele-managerro-autostrazile-romaniei-comparatii-cu-alte-tari-9071.html
 http://old.econtext.ro/dosar--2/analiza/topul-autostrazilor-cati-kilometri-de-autostrada-a-construit-fiecare-stat-din-ue-in-ultimii-20-de-ani-vezi-unde-se-plaseaza-romania.html
 http://www.gandul.info/financiar/romania-o-are-mica-cum-au-ajuns-romanii-sa-aiba-2-4-centimetri-germanii-15-cm-chiar-si-bulgarii-6-cm-de-autostrada-pe-cap-de-locuitor-10805033
 http://www.motorway.cz/motorways
 https://web.archive.org/web/20150224222020/http://www.realitatea.net/cati-kilometri-de-autostrada-a-construit-fiecare-tara-din-ue-in-ultimii-20-de-ani-vezi-topul_877963.html
 http://forum.peundemerg.ro/index.php?topic=251.0
 Richard J. Overy. "Cars, Roads, and Economic Recovery in Germany, 1932–1938". In: War and Economy in the Third Reich. Oxford: Clarendon / New York: Oxford University, 1994. . pp. 68–89
 https://web.archive.org/web/20150225171636/http://www.sntv.kva.se/files/Polhem%202006%E2%80%932007%20Boge.pdf
 http://ec.europa.eu/eurostat/tgm/table.do?tab=table&init=1&language=en&pcode=ttr00002&plugin=1

Europe transport-related lists
Europe Highest Paved